The 2011–12 Dayton Gems season was the second season in the Central Hockey League of the CHL franchise in Dayton, Ohio.

Regular season

Conference standings

Transactions

The Gems have been involved in the following transactions during the 2011–12 season.

Roster
Updated December 11, 2011.

See also
 2011–12 CHL season

References

External links
 2011–12 Dayton Gems season at Pointstreak

D
D
Ice hockey in Dayton, Ohio